Mastigiomyia is a genus of tachinid flies in the family Tachinidae.

Distribution
Mexico.

Species
M. delusa Reinhard, 1964

References

Diptera of North America
Dexiinae
Tachinidae genera
Monotypic Brachycera genera